Abilene Town is a 1946 American Western film directed by Edwin L. Marin and starring Randolph Scott, Ann Dvorak, Edgar Buchanan, Rhonda Fleming and Lloyd Bridges. Adapted from Ernest Haycox's 1941 novel Trail Town, the production's plot is set in the Old West, in the cattle town of Abilene, Kansas in 1870.

Plot
In the years following the Civil War, the state of Kansas is increasingly divided by opposing economic and social forces. Homesteaders are moving into the West, trying to start new lives, and their increasing presence is clashing with the established commercial interests of cattlemen, who had settled in the region before the war. Abilene, a major cattle town, is on the brink of armed conflict between the cattlemen and the homesteaders, and the town marshal, Dan Mitchell, strives to keep the peace between those two groups as well maintain the uneasy coexistence between Abilene's townspeople and the ranchers with their legion of cowboys. For years, the town had been literally divided, with the cattlemen and their supporters occupying one side of the main street and townspeople occupying the other side. Mitchell likes it this way; it makes things easier for him, and prevents dangerous confrontations from arising between the two factions. However, when homesteaders decide to lay stakes on the edge of town that existing balance is upset and leads to a deadly showdown.

The leader of the homesteaders is Henry Dreiser, a reasonable young man with common sense. The county sheriff, "Bravo" Trimble, is a lawman who would rather play cards than get involved in any real or potential unrest in Abilene. Mitchell, however, does strive to prevent the upcoming confrontation while also dealing with a clash in his personal life, which is divided as well between Rita, a flashy showgirl who works on the cattle drovers' side of the street, and Sherry, the modest, churchgoing daughter of a shopkeeper on the other side of the street.

Cast
 Randolph Scott as Marshal Dan Mitchell
 Ann Dvorak as Rita
 Edgar Buchanan as Sheriff Bravo Trimble
 Rhonda Fleming as Sherry Balder
 Lloyd Bridges as Henry Dreiser
 Helen Boyce as Big Annie
 Howard Freeman as Ed Balder
 Richard Hale as Charlie Fair
 Jack Lambert as Jet Younger
 Eddy Waller as Hannaberry
 Hank Patterson as Doug Neil
 Chubby Johnson as homesteader (uncredited in screen debut)
 Guy Wilkerson as card player with Sheriff Trimble (uncredited)

Reception
The film received generally positive reviews in newspapers and trade publications in 1946. In its January 9 review that year, the widely read New York-based entertainment paper Variety calls the production a "rip-snorting, spectacular meller" that is action-packed with a "tight screenplay". The Film Daily, another trade paper at the time, judged the production to be "a super-western" that succeeded "in capturing the hell-roaring spirit that marked the expansion of the United States westward". The reviewing service Harrison's Reports was more understated in its assessment of the film, characterizing it as a "fairly good Western", although the trade journal did admire its "fast-moving" plot and Randolph Scott's steadfast performance, observing that he "plays the fearless marshal with conviction". Mae Tinee, the critic for the Chicago Tribune in 1946, headlines her January 24 review "'Abilene Town' Among Better Western Films". In that appraisal Tinee compliments the production's attention to detail but expresses disappointment with the latter portion of the film, especially with regard to its ending:

Production
Lloyd Bridges, whose career was temporarily derailed as a result of the  blacklist, was the father of actors Beau Bridges and Jeff Bridges.

Home media
Abilene Town was released on Region 0 DVD by Alpha Video on July 27, 2010.

References

External links 

 
 
 

1946 films
1946 Western (genre) films
American Western (genre) films
Films directed by Edwin L. Marin
American black-and-white films
Films set in Kansas
1940s English-language films
1940s American films